Mammarella is an Italian surname. Notable people with the surname include:

Carlo Mammarella (born 1982), Italian footballer
Stefano Mammarella (born 1984), Italian futsal player
Tony Mammarella (1924–1977), American television producer and host
Cav. Franco Mammarella (born 1953), Italian Engineering Director at TRIUMF Vancouver Canada and founder of ARPICO, Associazione Ricercatori and Professionali nel Canada Occidentale

Italian-language surnames